PS: Political Science & Politics is a quarterly peer-reviewed academic journal covering all aspects of contemporary political phenomena and political science, published by  Cambridge University Press on behalf of the American Political Science Association. The journal was established in 1968 as PS, obtaining its current title in 1988. The editors-in-chief are Phillip Ardoin and Paul Gronke (Appalachian State University).

According to the Journal Citation Reports, the journal has a 2014 impact factor of 0.789, ranking it 74th out of 161 journals in the category "Political Science".

References

External links 
 

Political science journals
Publications established in 1968
Quarterly journals
Cambridge University Press academic journals
English-language journals
Academic journals associated with learned and professional societies